Ilyichyovka is a rural locality (a settlement) in Demidovskoye Rural Settlement, Gus-Khrustalny District, Vladimir Oblast, Russia. The population was 222 as of 2010.

Geography 
Ilyichyovka is located 36 km southwest of Gus-Khrustalny (the district's administrative centre) by road. Kuzmino is the nearest rural locality.

References 

Rural localities in Gus-Khrustalny District